Camp Biscayne, a rustic winter resort was founded in 1903 by Ralph Middleton Munroe so that there would be "a stopping place in Coconut Grove, Florida", as the Peacock Inn had closed in 1902.  Located a few lots south of the Barnacle (now the Barnacle Historic State Park), Camp Biscayne catered primarily to those who were interested in sailing, fishing, and the simple life.  By 1925 when Camp Biscayne was closed there were several cottages and a main lodge which seated 100 people in the dining room.

At Camp Biscayne, Munroe preserved as much of the hammock (tropical forest) as possible because he believed that it had "worked out its life's problems and established itself as the legitimate occupant of the land." Using the trees in the hammock for inspiration he named each of the 11 cottages for a native tree or for an ornamental. Each tree was tagged and a list of the trees was available to guests.

References
Notes

Bibliography

 Camp Biscayne Hotel Register,1914-1925. Archives of the Barnacle Historic State Park.(Primary source)
 Camp Biscayne Has Many Noted Winter Visitors.  Miami Herald, March 3, 1923.
 Coulombe, Deborah A. and Hiller, Herbert L.  Season of Innocence: The Munroes at the Barnacle in Early Coconut Grove. Miami: The Pickering Press, 1988.
 McIver, Stuart.  One Hundred Years on Biscayne Bay: 1887-1987.  Coconut Grove, Florida:  Biscayne Bay Yacht Club, 1987.
 Munroe, Ralph Middleton and Gilpin, Vincent.  The Commodore's Story: The Early Days on Biscayne Bay. Miami:  Historical Association of Southern Florida, 1985, pp. 306–314.
 Parks, Arva Moore and Bennett, Bo. Coconut Grove. Charleston, SC: Arcadia Publishing, 2010.
 Parks, Arva Moore. The Forgotten Frontier: Thru the Lens of Ralph Middleton Munroe. Miami:  Centennial Press, 2004.
 Taylor, Jean C.  "Camp Biscayne,"  Update. Miami:  Historical Association of Southern Florida, Vol. 5, No. 3, February, 1978, pp. 6–8.

External links 
 The Barnacle Historic State Park

Resorts in Florida
Buildings and structures in Miami